The  of the Japan Academy Film Prize is one of the annual Awards given by the Japan Academy Film Prize Association.

History
Although the Japan Academy Film Prize has been awarded annually since 1978 to Japanese films, animation films were disregarded in the early years of the Prize.  Animation films have included top grossing Japanese films of the year, such as Doraemon (1980,1981,1983,1984), Studio Ghibli's Kiki's Delivery Service (1989), Only Yesterday (1991), Porco Rosso (1992), Pom Poko (1994), and Whisper of the Heart (1995).  Yet no animated film received a nomination for a Japan Academy Film Prize during those years.  This was notably different from other major Japanese film awards, such as the Mainichi Film Award and Kinema Junpo, which both awarded Picture of the Year to My Neighbor Totoro in 1988.

In 1990, the Japan Academy Film Prize Association gave a Special Award to Kiki's Delivery Service at the 13th the Japan Academy Film Prize, and again in 1995 to Takahata's Pom Poko.  However, there was still no nomination for these animated box office hits.

But in 1998, the Japan Academy Film Prize Association's attitude toward animated films changed with the hugely successful Princess Mononoke, the highest box-office record ever in the history of Japanese cinema, which dominated the other major film prizes (See: Awards). As a result, at the 21st Japan Academy Film Prize that year, Studio Ghibli's Princess Mononoke became the first-ever animation film to be nominated for and win the Japan Academy Film Prize Picture of the Year. Yoshiyuki Tomino, famed for Gundam, mentioned it: "A hole that Hayao Miyazaki made spending ten years".

In 2002, at the 25th Japan Academy Film Prize, another animated film by Hayao Miyazaki and Studio Ghibli, Spirited Away, was again nominated and won the Picture of the Year.

In 2007, the Japan Academy Film Prize followed the American Academy Awards, which instituted the Academy Award for Best Animated Feature in 2002, by creating the Japan Academy Film Prize for Animation of the Year.

List of winners and nominees
Studio Ghibli with 4 films has the most awards as a studio while Studio Chizu & Madhouse feature prominently. No franchise has won the award twice but Detective Conan is the most nominated franchise with 8 nominations while Doraemon, One Piece & Evangelion feature prominently.

See also

 List of animation awards

References

External links
Japan Academy Film Prize official website - 

Anime awards
Awards for best animated feature film
Animation of the Year
Awards established in 2007
2007 establishments in Japan